Love Is Back was first aired in 2014 in Mainland China. It was produced by syndicated film and television company, together with its sister films My Daughter and Waking Love Up and wreaked havoc in May 2014.It was broadcast on Anhui Television, Heilongjiang Satellite TV, Shaanxi Satellite TV and GRT Satellite Channel on July 21, 2014.

Broadcast Time

First Broadcast

Story Content 
Tells the story of men and women in the new era, afraid of marriage, late marriage, late childbearing.

List of Actors

The Leading Actors 
 Stephy Qi（play the role of Mingliang）- 30 years old, Creative Director of G&K Advertising Characters: Giant Woman, Queen of Blast, Action, Stormwind Code name "Giant Woman".She believes that women's happiness depends on themselves, and that marriage only reduces women's points, and their attitude toward their lovers is a way to win, and that is, to wield it, a "fighter" among women.
 Michael Chen（play the role of Gaojian）- 32 years old, Director of Operations at G&K Advertising
Character label: dim sum man, playboy, commitment phobia, bad man stands for the code name dim sum man.Personality tyrannical, self-righteous, can speak good way habit to hide their true feelings.He believed that if love was a snack and marriage was a meal, he would rather be a snack man than a snack man.Suffering from "commitment phobia", he firmly believes that a man as long as a commitment is over, will lose his freedom for the rest of his life, imprisoned in marriage.Ruffians under the appearance of a gentle and considerate heart, will use their own way to care for the people around.

Ratings 
Based on csm data, ratings include full-time ratings and market share parameters.

References

External links 

     《愛情回來了》安徽卫视专题
   《愛情回來了》观剧报告 网易娱乐中心

 Chinese television series
 Anhui Television